Cady Caroline Chin See Chong (born 6 March 2003) is a Surinamese footballer who plays as a left midfielder for SV Transvaal and the Suriname women's national team.

Early life
Chin See Chong has played for Transvaal in Suriname.

International career
Chin See Chong capped for Suriname at senior level during the 2022 CONCACAF W Championship qualification.

References

External links

2003 births
Living people
Sportspeople from Paramaribo
Surinamese women's footballers
Women's association football midfielders
S.V. Transvaal players
Suriname women's international footballers
Surinamese people of Chinese descent
Sportspeople of Chinese descent